The Poker Hall of Fame is the hall of fame of professional poker in the United States. Founded in Las Vegas, it was created in 1979 by Benny Binion, the owner of the Horseshoe Casino, to preserve the names and legacies of the world's greatest poker players and to serve as a tourist attraction to his casino. Binion was known for the creative ways in which he marketed his casino. In 1949, he convinced Johnny Moss and Nick "The Greek" Dandolos to play high-stakes poker heads up where the public could watch them. In 1970, he invited a group of poker players to compete in what would be the first World Series of Poker (WSOP). When Harrah's Entertainment, later known as Caesars Entertainment, acquired the rights to the WSOP in 2004, it also assumed ownership of the Poker Hall of Fame.  Currently, membership in the Poker Hall of Fame is handled directly by the WSOP.

As of 2023, 61 people have been inducted into the Poker Hall of Fame, 32 of whom are still living.

Requirements 
Before the 2009 World Series of Poker, then-WSOP Commissioner Jeffrey Pollack announced that the process for becoming a member into the Poker Hall of Fame would undergo a slight modification. Starting in 2009, the Poker Hall of Fame started accepting nominations from the public.  This move was intended to increase interest in the Hall. Almost immediately after this decision was announced, Party Poker started an online campaign to get its representative and World Poker Tour commentator Mike Sexton elected to the Hall.  Other poker sites, namely PokerStars' Tom McEvoy, followed suit by pushing their own poker professionals.  The requirements for the Poker Hall of Fame are as follows:
A gambler must have played poker against acknowledged top competition,
Played for high stakes,
Played consistently well, gained the respect of peers,
And stood the test of time.
Or, for non-players, contributed to the overall growth and success of the game of poker, with indelible positive and lasting results.

In 2009, 23-year-old online poker professional Tom Dwan was a finalist for the Poker Hall of Fame because of public balloting. As a result, a new age requirement was added in 2011. This rule, known as the "Chip Reese Rule", established a minimum age of 40 to be inducted into the Hall of Fame. This new requirement eliminated some players who were regular nominees over the previous years, such as Phil Ivey and Daniel Negreanu (both of whom were eventually inducted upon reaching the age threshold).

The award
Admission into the Poker Hall of Fame is considered one of the greatest honors in poker.   In his acceptance speech, T. J. Cloutier declared, "It's one of two things I've always wanted to win."  Barbara Enright, the first woman inducted into the Hall, considers her induction to be a "lifetime achievement honor."

Before being acquired by Harrah's Casino, R.S. Owens & Company was commissioned to design an award for Poker Hall of Famers.  The award was an eight-inch-tall piece of glass with a hand of cards sandblasted at the bottom, the winner's name, and the words "Poker Hall of Fame" in a circle. The circle had a gold emblem bonded to the glass and had the Binion's Horseshoe Casino logo in it. There was a gold plated base with three gold-plated stacks of chips.

Membership

See also
World Poker Tour Walk of Fame

References

Poker players
Halls of fame in Nevada